Matteo Carlo Ardemagni (born 26 March 1987) is an Italian footballer who plays as a forward for  club Siena.

Career

Milan
A product of Milan's youth team, he has made a few appearances as a substitute for their Serie A team. He was then sent on loan to various Serie C1 teams, namely Perugia, Pizzighettone and Pro Patria, before being ultimately sold to Serie B side Triestina in July 2008 in a co-ownership agreement with the alabardati, for €5,000. In June 2009 Triestina bought him outright for another €50,000.

Cittadella
In summer 2009 Ardemagni left for Cittadella in a temporary deal as its flagship striker Riccardo Meggiorini left for Bari (via Internazionale and Genoa). Ardemagni was the team top-scorer in 2009–10 season with 22 goals.

Atalanta
In June 2010, Cittadella bought him in a co-ownership deal, for €100,000, but on 13 July 2010 he was sold to fellow Serie B side Atalanta for €3.55 million (€1.45 million to Triestina, €2.1 million to Cittadella, as well as cost extra €200,000 to Atalanta) which were recently relegated from Serie A. It was reported that Chievo also made a bid to Triestina but Atalanta agreed a deal with Cittadella. He signed a 4-year contract. As part of the deal, Cittadella signed Manolo Gabbiadini and Daniele Gasparetto in a co-ownership deal for a small fee of €500 each on 13 July.

In January 2011 he was loaned to Padova. He returned to Serie B again in January 2012, for Modena F.C. Circa 2012 Ardemagni also signed a new 5-year contract with Atalanta, however he was loaned to Modena, Cheivo and Carpi in 2012–13 and 2013–14 season.

On 9 August 2014 he was signed by Spezia on a temporary deal. On 2 February 2015 he was signed by Perugia. The loan was extended on 14 July.

Avellino
On 31 August 2016 Ardemagni was signed by Avellino in a definitive deal on a three-year contract.

Ascoli
On 16 August 2018 he was signed by Ascoli on a three-year deal.

Frosinone
On 27 January 2020 he moved to Frosinone. On 12 January 2021 he joined Reggiana on loan.

Siena
On 31 January 2022, Ardemagni signed with Siena.

Career statistics

References

External links
 
 

1987 births
Living people
Footballers from Milan
Italian footballers
Association football forwards
Serie A players
Serie B players
Serie C players
A.C. Milan players
A.C. Perugia Calcio players
A.S. Pizzighettone players
Aurora Pro Patria 1919 players
U.S. Triestina Calcio 1918 players
A.S. Cittadella players
Atalanta B.C. players
Calcio Padova players
Modena F.C. players
A.C. ChievoVerona players
A.C. Carpi players
Spezia Calcio players
U.S. Avellino 1912 players
Ascoli Calcio 1898 F.C. players
Frosinone Calcio players
A.C. Reggiana 1919 players
A.C.N. Siena 1904 players
Italy youth international footballers